Ivar Olaus Nordkild (born 14 May 1941) is a former Norwegian biathlete. He competed for Norway and won a gold medal in the 1965 Biathlon World Championships in Elverum in the team competition. He won a second gold medal in the men's relay in the 1966 world championships in Garmisch-Partenkirchen and a silver medal in the same event in 1971.

Biathlon results
All results are sourced from the International Biathlon Union.

Olympic Games

World Championships
3 medals (2 gold, 1 silver)

*During Olympic seasons competitions are only held for those events not included in the Olympic program.
**The team (time) event was removed in 1965, whilst the relay was added in 1966, and the sprint was added in 1974.

References

External links
 

1941 births
Living people
Norwegian male biathletes
Biathletes at the 1972 Winter Olympics
Olympic biathletes of Norway
Biathlon World Championships medalists